A gag name is a pseudonym intended to be humorous through its similarity to both a real name and a term or phrase that is funny, strange, or vulgar. The source of humor stems from the double meaning behind the phrase, although use of the name without prior knowledge of the joke could also be funny. Examples of the use of gag names occur in works of fiction in which there is a roll call, a listing of names, or a prank call.

Some names that would be considered gag names have been adopted as stage names by performers, often in the adult entertainment industry.

Examples

People
Occasionally, real people with a name that could be interpreted as a funny or vulgar phrase are subject to mockery or parody. For example, Hu Jintao, former General Secretary of the Chinese Communist Party, whose surname is pronounced like "who", and former Chinese Premier Wen Jiabao, whose surname is pronounced like "when", have occasionally been the topic of humor similar to the "Who's on First?" sketch. Former US Congressman from New Hampshire Dick Swett's name, when pronounced, sounds like common slang for male genital perspiration. Other names in politics which could be regarded as gag names include John Boehner, Harry Baals, Dick Armey, and Tiny Kox (although Boehner's surname is properly pronounced "bay-ner", someone who has not heard the name in news coverage could mispronounce it as "boner", while Kox's name could be vulgar in English, but not in his home nation's Dutch). There are also various people named Richard "Dick" Head and Mike Hunt.

Australian entrepreneur Dick Smith released a brand of matches named Dickheads, modeled after established brand Redheads.

Roller derby teams and players frequently use gag names. Often, these are double entendres or suggestive.

The genuine Indian name "Dikshit" ("dick shit") has been repeatedly mocked in mass media, often to the offense of people bearing the name.

Another well-known example was the Canadian Dick Assman, who received some public notoriety in 1995 for his name over the course of four months, especially from the Late Show with David Letterman. He died in 2016.

In 2016, Seattle resident Rudy Pantoja Jr. received widespread online attention when, after a woman accosted him with a camera as he was leaving a Seattle City Council meeting, he gave his name as "Hugh Mungus" (humongous).

Newspapers
On April 13, 2003, James Scott of the Charleston, South Carolina newspaper The Post and Courier reported that "Heywood Jablome" (a pun for "Hey, would you blow me?", "blow" being slang for fellatio) was escorted from the premises while counterprotesting Martha Burk's protest at the Masters Tournament. He subsequently admitted to his being "duped" by the protester, who was in reality a morning disc jockey for a regional FM radio station.

In 2014, Prior Lake High School students received a letter purportedly from the school district that described an upcoming "mandatory vagina inspection" for female students. The letter was signed "Barry McCockiner, Director, Department of Vaginal Corrections". The prank attracted worldwide attention and spawned copycat incidents at other schools around the country.

Radio
In 2007, a BBC radio presenter was reprimanded after tricking a fellow disc jockey into reading out a fake request for a listener named Connie Lingus ("cunnilingus") from Ivan R. Don ("I've an hardon").

Television
In July 2013, KTVU in San Francisco aired fake names of the Asiana Airlines Flight 214 pilots: "Sum Ting Wong" ("something wrong"), "Wi Tu Lo" ("we too low"), "Ho Lee Fuk" ("holy fuck"), and "Bang Ding Ow" (onomatopoeia possibly involved with a crash), a false report which had been incorrectly confirmed by an NTSB intern acting "outside the scope of his authority," who, according to an NTSB spokesperson, had been "acting in good faith and trying to be helpful." The station later apologized, and fired Roland De Wolk and two other news producers over the error.

In January 2017, U.K. sports broadcaster Sky Sports inadvertently reported that Aberdeen had signed a Turkish footballer called "Yerdas Selzavon" (phonetically "your da (father) sells Avon", a reference to the direct-selling cosmetics company) after falling for a gag name on a fake Twitter account.

In 2017, a taxi driver filmed protesting against changes to taxi licensing in Melbourne, Australia gave his name as "Tsim Booky" to the Channel 9 Today Show; tsimbouki (τσιμπούκι) refers to fellatio in modern Greek.

In June 2021, the recently launched GB News channel was plagued by a rash of hoax messages from news comment callers using gag names such as Mike Hunt ("my cunt") and Mike Oxlong ("my cock's long") to get on the air.

Social media
In 2021, British former-politician Nigel Farage, who for a fee would upload personalised videos for fans on the Cameo website, was tricked into posting birthday greetings for "Hugh Janus" (huge anus).

Businesses
Gag names can also be applied to businesses, such as Howard Stern's use of the fictitious "Sofa King": in a hoax advertisement, the store was described as being "Sofa King great" (i.e. "so fucking great"). A January 18, 2000, FCC complaint about using the phrase was dismissed. A similar sketch was performed on Saturday Night Live in early 2007, portraying Sofa King as a new store opening after the success of Mattress King. A joke about the Fuller Brush Company merging with Schick razors to become the "Fuller Schick Company" (i.e. "full of shit") was popular enough by 1994 that a New York magazine competition, having solicited joke company mergers, began its results with "Will all those who submitted Fuller Schick please report to the Office of the Grand Inquisitor?"

London Zoo has to employ a telephone screening service on April Fools' Day, because they are deluged with calls from people tricked into asking for gag names such as Sue Keeper (zoo keeper), Ali Gaiter (alligator), Ben Gwinn (penguin) or Jim Panzie (chimpanzee).

Examples in fiction

Film
The series of James Bond books and films often use double entendres for the names of Bond girls, such as "Honey Ryder" from Dr. No, "Bibi Dahl" from For Your Eyes Only, "Holly Goodhead" from Moonraker, "Xenia Onatopp" from GoldenEye, "Chu Mei" (chew me) from The Man with the Golden Gun, "Plenty O'Toole" from Diamonds Are Forever, and, most famously, "Pussy Galore" from Goldfinger. This is parodied in the Austin Powers series of spoofs on the spy genre; Austin Powers: International Man of Mystery features a villain named "Alotta Fagina", who must repeat her name several times because Austin misunderstands it. In the second sequel Austin Powers in Goldmember, Austin runs into a pair of Japanese twins named "Fook Mi" and "Fook Yu". Another example being a character from the animated Danish film Terkel in Trouble named "Dick Balsac".

In Monty Python's Life of Brian, there is an extensive use of Dog Latin as a tool for creating gag names. The protagonist's biological father is believed to be called "Naughtius Maximus", while a friend of Pontius Pilate is named "Biggus Dickus" and his wife's name is "Incontinentia Buttocks". One of Pilate's guards also mentions "Sillius Soddus".

The widely known gag name "Mike Hunt", a homonym for "my cunt", appears in the 1982 teen comedy film, Porky's, where a waitress receives a phone call and asks, "Is Mike Hunt here? Has anyone seen Mike Hunt?" ("Everybody in town!" replies a customer familiar with the gag).

The name "Farquaad" ("fuckwad") from Shrek is notorious for its occurrence in a family-oriented film.

Television
Gag names have appeared prominently in several adult-oriented American animated series, including Beavis and Butthead, South Park, and most notably The Simpsons, where Bart Simpson frequently calls Moe's Tavern asking for nonexistent patrons with gag names, prompting bartender Moe Szyslak to call out for the person. These gag names include, "Mike Rotch" (my crotch), "Seymour Butz" (see more butts), "Oliver Klozoff" (all of her clothes off), "Amanda Hugginkiss" (a man to hug and kiss), "Ollie Tabooger" (I'll eat a booger), and "Homer Sexual" (homosexual). This running joke is based on the real-life Tube Bar prank calls. However, in the episode "Flaming Moe's", this gag backfired against Bart when he called for a person named "Hugh Jass" ("huge ass") when it was revealed that there actually was a patron at Moe's Tavern named Hugh Jass. Similarly, in the episode "Donnie Fatso", a call comes through for a "Yuri Nator" (urinator), which is revealed to be an actual bar patron.

Other
Shenzhen's KK100 building used to be known as the Kingkey (a near homophone of "kinky") 100 and Kingkey Finance Tower.

The title of the 1979 Frank Zappa album Sheik Yerbouti ("shake your booty") referenced the hit disco song (Shake, Shake, Shake) Shake Your Booty.

Examples in other languages

The 2005 South Korean television series Hello My Teacher was criticised for its inclusion of a character with the gag name "Nam Sung-ki". "Sung-ki" is a common masculine name, but "Nam Sung-ki" is homophonous with the Korean language word for "penis".

Israeli Hebrew
Ghil'ad Zuckermann suggests that at the end of the twentieth century there was a wave of jocular Israeli gag names, most of them based on rebracketing. He provides the following gag names, all based on common names that, when rebracketed, create a jocular meaning:

 Simkha Rif, a falafel salesperson, based on the rebracketing of sim kharíf, literally "put hot!" (masculine, singular), i.e. "add some pepper!", a sentence often heard in Israeli falafel shops. 
 Asaf Lots, a stinky person, based on the rebracketing of asá flots, meaning "[he] farted (masculine, singular)", "[he] made a fart".
 Boaz Orly, a miserable person, based on the rebracketing of bo azór li, meaning "come, help me!".
 ‘Alila Maslul, an Arab female model, based on the rebracketing of alí lamaslúl, meaning "go up the catwalk!" (feminine, singular).
 Micky Pelli, a paratrooper whose parachute did not open, based on the rebracketing of mi kipél li, meaning "Who folded [it] for me?".
 Mira Tsakh, a female detective, based on the rebracketing of mi ratsákh, meaning "Who murdered?", "Who committed the murder?".
 Maya Feba, an ugly woman, based on the rebracketing of ma yafé ba, meaning "What is beautiful about her?".
 Rut Tavor, a female army operator, based on the rebracketing of rut avór, meaning "Roger, Over".
 Becky Tsur, a female stenographer, based on the rebracketing of bekitsúr, meaning "briefly, in a short manner".
 Avi Ron, pilot, based on the rebracketing of avirón, meaning "airplane".
 Beri Tsakala, an Ethiopian runner, based on the rebracketing of beritsá kalá, meaning "running lightly".
 Eli Kopter, a helicopter pilot, based on the rebracketing of helikópter, "helicopter".
 Amit Romem, a gay man, based on the rebracketing of hamitromém, literally "raising himself", referring to "homosexual man".
 Basam Shaka, an Arab drug-addict, based on basám shaká, meaning "soaked in the drug" (masculine, singular).

German

 The name 'Kurt C. Hose' is pronounced 'kurze Hose'. In English, this means 'short trousers'.
 A soldier called 'Butte', who has the rank of a corporal (Hauptgefreiter) is abbreviated as HG. Butte, sounding similar to 'Hagebutte' which means rose hip.

Turkish 

Fenasi Kerim is a widely used Turkish gag name, based on fena sikerim, "I'll fuck (you) so bad" in Turkish.

Turkish humor also incorporates "foreign" gag names based on wordplay with the supposedly foreign names hinting at obscene Turkish words. Examples are as follows.

 Hans Göteller, göt eller meaning "grabs ass".
 Vladimir Kalinski, kalynski being a wordplay on kalın sik, meaning "thick dick".
 Ivan Divandelen, divan delen meaning sofa driller, implies that "the sofa is drilled" in a sexual fashion.
 Aleksandr Siksallandr, sik sallandır meaning "swing (your) dick".
 Tutsiki Koyama or Koyarama, meaning "hold (your) dick and pound the pussy".
Oramakoma Buramako, meaning "don't shove it there, shove it here", another implication of sexual intercourse.
Chong Song Tung Cheng, a play on çok soktun çek, meaning "you shove it too much, pull it back"
 Yarrahimin Bashi is a widely used Turkish football meme hinting an African footballer with the word being a pseudo-foreign form of yarağımın başı, "tip of my dick" in Turkish. The meme makes fun of Turkish football clubs failing to materialize an expected transfer during the summer transfer window and resorting to transfer Yarrahimin Bashi instead. This meme incorporates the image of Nigerian defensive midfielder Onyinde Ndidi.
 El Amcukiye is a "city in Syria", another pseudo-Arabic word play with the word amcık, vagina in Turkish.
 Female given names Eleanor and Elizabeth are slangs for masturbation as the Turkish word for hand is el.
Real life names also can be used in the form of gag names by being similar to Turkish words. Examples are as follows.
Indian state of Sikkim and the town of Yarram in Victoria, Australia became memes among Turkish netizens as both words more or less mean "my dick" in Turkish. A scene from the movie The Way Back in which a monk mentions of a trail to Sikkim is shared as a meme.

Italian 
 "Thomas Turbato", which means "I have masturbated you".
 "Paul Codio", which, similarly to "Eddie O'Cane" sounds like a blasphemy.
 "Harry Tardato", which means "he is retarded".
 "Pompi Nando", which is "giving a blowjob"
 "Vacca Carlo", which is like saying "go shit it".
 "Mori Remo", sounds very similar to "we will die".
 "Drome Dario" is the exact spelling of "dromedary".

Russian 
 "Тояма Токанава" (Toyama Tokanawa), a faux Japanese name which means "Now a pit, now a ditch".

See also 
 List of places with unusual names
 List of chemical compounds with unusual names
 Knock-knock joke
 
 Aptronym; a personal name aptly suited to its owner

References

External links
 The Stranger - News - City - They Like Mike (news article)
 KOMO News - Too Racy for Seattle TV? (news article)
 BBC - 'Most unfortunate names' revealed (news article)
 Hooray for Heywood Snopes

Humour
Names
Practical jokes
Off-color humor